Vitalicio Seguros was a Spanish professional road bicycle racing cycling team active between 1998 and 2000. It helped launch the careers of triple world champion Óscar Freire, 2001 Vuelta a España winner Ángel Casero and Tour de France yellow jersey wearer Igor González de Galdeano.

The team was started by manager in 1998 with funding from Assicurazioni Generali, who wished to promote their Catalan brand and made a three-year commitment.

Major wins
1998
 Stage 3 Vuelta a Aragón, Serguei Smetanine
 Stages 1 & 2 Vuelta Ciclista a La Rioja, Serguei Smetanine
 Stage 3 Vuelta Ciclista a La Rioja, Juan Carlos Domínguez
 Stage 4 Vuelta Asturias, Santiago Blanco
 Road Race Championships, Ángel Luis Casero
 Stage 1 Vuelta a Castilla y León, Óscar Freire
  Overall Volta Ciclista a Catalunya, Hernán Buenahora
 Stages 6 & 7
 Stage 1 Tour of Galicia, Serguei Smetanine
 Stages 13, 15 & 20 Vuelta a España, Andrei Zintchenko
 Trofeo Manacor, Elio Aggiano
1999
 Stage 5 Tirreno–Adriatico, Igor González de Galdeano
  Overall Vuelta a Aragón, Juan Carlos Domínguez
 Stage 3
  Overall Vuelta Ciclista a La Rioja, Juan Carlos Domínguez
 Stage 1, Serguei Smetanine
 Stage 3, Juan Carlos Domínguez
  Overall Vuelta Asturias
 Stage 1, Álvaro González
 Road Race Championships, Ángel Luis Casero
 Prologue & Stage 3 Volta Ciclista a Catalunya, Ángel Luis Casero
 Stage 3 Vuelta a Castilla y León, Elio Aggiano
 Stage 3 Vuelta a Burgos, Serguei Smetanine
 Prologue & Stage 12 Vuelta a España, Igor González de Galdeano
 Subida al Naranco, Santiago Blanco
  Overall Escalada a Montjuïc, Andrei Zintchenko
 Stage 1a
 World Road Race championships, Óscar Freire
2000
 Stage 4 Vuelta a Andalucia Ruta Ciclista del Sol, Santiago Blanco
  Overall Vuelta Ciclista a la Rioja, Miguel Ángel Martín Perdiguero
 Stage 4 
 Prologue Giro d'Italia, Jan Hruška
 Stage 11 Giro d'Italia, Víctor Hugo Peña
 Stage 17 Giro d'Italia, Álvaro González
 Stage 20 Giro d'Italia, Jan Hruška
 Road Race Championships, Álvaro González de Galdeano
 Stage 9 Volta a Portugal, Pedro Horrillo
 Stage 5 Tour of Galicia, Iván Ramiro Parra
 Stage 14 Vuelta a España, Álvaro González

Defunct cycling teams based in Spain
Cycling teams established in 1998
Cycling teams disestablished in 2000